The Handweavers Guild of America (HGA) is an association of fiber artists founded in the U.S. in 1969. 
The guild provides educational programs, conferences, and scholarships for fiber arts students.
It publishes the quarterly journal Shuttle Spindle & Dyepot.

Foundation

The Handweavers Guild of America (HGA) was founded in 1969. 
The well-known New York weaver Berta Frey was one of the founders and served on the guild's first board of directors.
The objective is "to inspire creativity and encourage excellence in the fiber arts."
The organization is non-profit and has an international membership.
Members include weavers, spinners, dyers, basketmakers, fiber artists and teachers.
As of 2006 the guild was based in Atlanta, Georgia.

Activities

The guild holds conferences and provides educational programs.
The guild provides Dendel Scholarships to assist undergraduate and graduate fiber arts students in the U.S. and Canada.
Selection is based on artistic and technical merit rather than on financial need.
HGA scholarships have similar requirements.
The HGA website provides a list of spinning guilds in the US, UK, Canada, Australia, New Zealand, Denmark, and Switzerland.
This may be useful to fiber artists looking for local sources of supply.
In 1986 the HGA held Convergence '86 in Toronto, Canada, its first biennial meeting outside the U.S. 
The conference was co-hosted by the Ontario Crafts Council and the Ontario Handweavers & Spinners.
About 2,000 weavers and spinners attended the conference and more than forty galleries in Toronto and the region gave weaving exhibitions.
The HGA offers the Certificate of Excellence (COE) in Handweaving, Handspinning, Dyeing, and Basketry.

Magazine

Members receive the quarterly journal Shuttle Spindle & Dyepot.
The magazine publishes articles on fiber arts design, history, shows, education, products, books and news, and gives information on HGA programs.
The magazine had a circulation of about 6,000 in 2012, with a well-educated and knowledgeable readership in the fiber arts community.

References
Citations

Sources

1969 establishments in the United States
American weavers
Guilds in the United States
Organizations based in Georgia (U.S. state)
Organizations established in 1969
Textile arts of the United States
Textile arts organizations
Spinning